John George Lane (born 10 November 1931) is an English former professional footballer who played as a forward. He made 103 appearances in the Football League for Birmingham City and Notts County. Lane also played in the Southern League for Hinckley Athletic, in the Birmingham & District League for Boldmere St. Michaels, Kidderminster Harriers and Evesham United, and in the Midland League for Belper Town.

Life and career

Early life and career
John George Lane was born on 10 November 1931 in Selly Oak, Birmingham. He played youth football for Selly Park Blacks, and later joined Boldmere St. Michaels, from where the 17-year-old signed professional forms with Birmingham City in September 1949. While doing his National Service in the Army, he was successful in athletics and was runner-up in the Western Command heavyweight boxing championship.

Birmingham City
Lane was demobbed in early 1953, and made his first-team debut for Birmingham on 6 April at home to Doncaster Rovers in the Second Division. A "big six-footer", he showed strength, an "ability to hit the heavy ball with surprising power", and a "tremendously long throw-in". His volley tied the scores, Birmingham won 2–1, and the following day's Birmingham Gazette headline-writers suggested he might be the solution to the club's problems at centre forward. He kept his place for the remaining five games of the season and scored twice more, but Ted Purdon began the following season at centre forward, scored 15 goals from 23 matches, and it was only after Purdon's transfer to Sunderland in January 1954 that Lane returned to the side. He scored twice from eight league matches, half at centre forward and half at his preferred position of inside forward, in 1953–54, and appeared more regularly the following season.

When Birmingham faced Liverpool on 11 December 1954, Lane opened the scoring after just 48 seconds, somewhat fortunately, as his shot deflected off a defender's foot leaving the goalkeeper stranded. By half-time, the score was 4–1, and the eventual 9–1 win remains, Liverpool's record defeat in senior competition. He contributed six goals in the last couple of months of the season as Birminghamin ninth place at the beginning of March and 11 points behind the leaders, albeit with games in handwent on to win the 1954–55 Second Division title, ahead of Luton Town and Brentford on goal average.

Although primarily used as cover for any of the forward positions in the following season, Lane played in ten First Division matches and scored once, in a 4–3 win against Manchester City. Lane also played in Birmingham's second match in the inaugural edition of the Inter-Cities Fairs Cup, a 1–0 win away to the Zagreb XI. He and Bill Finney set up the goal for Eddy Brown after eight minutes, but Lane was substituted after half an hour because he "had found himself on the receiving end of some rough challenges from the home side and was starting to retaliate." That was the last of his 49 appearances for Birmingham City. The Sports Argus summed him up as "one of those who never let the side down. But being everybody's deputy has its drawbacks in that it never gets you very far."

Notts County
On 2 July 1956, Lane signed for Second Division club Notts County, who were "crying out for a centre forward to convert the work of Ron Wylie". The report also mentioned that he was "one of the few first-class footballers to play in contact lenses." In the first three months of the season he scored seven goals from 16 matches, but by January 1957 he had lost not only the centre-forward position but his place in the side entirely. Towards the end of February, the Football Post was lamenting how Lane, for whom County had paid a substantial fee, "has the physique and shooting power and was expected to inspire a snappier mood, but unfortunately he has yet to strike his true form."

Recalled in late October, Lane's form improved under the coaching of manager and former England international forward Tommy Lawton and "his own enthusiasm for his work", and he finally established himself in the side. His 11 league goals from 26 matches made him the club's top scorer for the season, but the team finished 23rd in the table and were relegated to the Third Division. Early in the 1958–59 season, Notts County accepted his transfer request. He remained with the club, but his season was interrupted by injuries, and when fit, he played little first-team football.

Non-league football
He was transfer-listed at the end of the season at a fee of £4,000, and in the absence of interest from Football League clubs, signed for Hinckley Athletic, newly elected to the Southern League. He scored four goals in the club's first ever fixture at that level, an 8–1 win at home to fellow newcomers Ashford Town, and was a regular in the side, but was listed for transfer at the end of the campaign. After scoring "plenty of goals" for Kidderminster Harriers during the 1960–61 season, Lane moved on to another Birmingham & District League club, Evesham United, in June 1961, but he was released in late September to cut costs and signed for Belper Town of the Midland League.

Career statistics

Honours
Birmingham City
 Football League Second Division winners: 1954–55

References

Sources
 
 

1931 births
Living people
People from Selly Oak
Footballers from Birmingham, West Midlands
English footballers
Association football forwards
Boldmere St. Michaels F.C. players
Birmingham City F.C. players
Notts County F.C. players
Hinckley United F.C. players
Kidderminster Harriers F.C. players
Evesham United F.C. players
Belper Town F.C. players
English Football League players
Southern Football League players
Midland Football League players